The Fossil Ridge Wilderness is a U.S. Wilderness Area located approximately  northeast of Gunnison, Colorado in the Gunnison National Forest. The  wilderness includes Fossil Ridge, a high, exposed ridge of Paleozoic carbonates that contain epeiric sea fossils. Elk, deer, mountain goats, and bighorn sheep can be found in the wilderness.

References

External links
 

Wilderness areas of Colorado
Protected areas established in 1993
Protected areas of Gunnison County, Colorado
Gunnison National Forest
1993 establishments in Colorado